Hirschfeld is a municipality in the Elbe-Elster district, in Brandenburg, Germany.

History
From 1952 to 1990, Hirschfeld was part of the Bezirk Cottbus of East Germany.

Demography

References

Localities in Elbe-Elster